"Go Go Go (Down the Line)" (often credited as "Down the Line") is a song by Roy Orbison, released in 1956. According to the authorised biography of Roy Orbison, this was the B-side to Orbison's first Sun Records release "Ooby Dooby". This was the first song written by Orbison.

Background 
The song was released as a Sun Records single in May, 1956, Sun 242, Matrix # U-193, as the B side to "Ooby Dooby" with the backup group The Teen Kings.

The song was later released under the title "Down the Line" by Jerry Lee Lewis and Ricky Nelson. Sam Phillips, the owner and founder of Sun Records, bought out Orbison's songs on Sun Records and placed his name on the songwriting credits although Orbison was the actual songwriter. The song was re-recorded by Orbison with the Art Movement in 1969, for the album The Big O released in 1970, and was called "Down the Line".

Covers 
Jerry Lee Lewis released the song as a Sun single (Sun 288) in February, 1958 backed with "Breathless." "Down the Line" reached no. 51 on the Billboard pop singles chart.

Jerry Lee Lewis also released a version on the 1973 Mercury Records album The Session...Recorded in London with Great Artists.

It has been covered by The Del-Tinos in 1963, Mickey Gilley in 1964, The Hollies in 1965, Cliff Richard and the Drifters in 1959, Billy Fury and Peter Case in 1993. Ricky Nelson recorded a version of the song for his 1958 album, Ricky Nelson. A version by Johnny Cash appears on Unearthed.

Orbison performed the song on his Cinemax cable concert special Roy Orbison and Friends, A Black and White Night in 1988 featuring an all-star cast of guest musicians, including Bruce Springsteen, Elvis Costello, James Burton, and T Bone Burnett. The song also appeared on the album from the special A Black & White Night Live released in 1989.

References

1956 singles
Songs written by Roy Orbison
Roy Orbison songs
Buddy Holly songs
The Hollies songs
Cliff Richard songs
Ricky Nelson songs
Johnny Cash songs
Jerry Lee Lewis songs
Song recordings produced by Sam Phillips
Rockabilly songs
Sun Records singles
1956 songs